Kővágószőlős is a village in Baranya county, Hungary.

External links 
   
 Street map 

Populated places in Baranya County